Michael Rezendes is an American journalist and a member of the global investigative team at Associated Press. He is the recipient of a Pulitzer Prize for his investigative work for The Boston Globe. Since joining the Globe he has covered presidential, state and local politics, and was a weekly essayist, roving national correspondent, city hall bureau chief, and the deputy editor for national news.

Personal life and education
Rezendes is of Portuguese descent, born in Maine. He graduated from Boston University with a BA in English and with an MFA from American Film Institute. In 2008 and 2009, he was the recipient of a John S. Knight journalism fellowship at Stanford University.

Career

Before arriving at The Boston Globe, Rezendes was a staff writer at The Washington Post, and a government and politics reporter for the San Jose Mercury News and the Boston Phoenix. He was also a contributing writer at Boston magazine and the editor of the East Boston Community News.

He joined The Boston Globe in 1989, and moved to Associated Press in the Spring of 2019.

Catholic church scandal

For more than a decade Rezendes was a member of the Globe's Spotlight Team. He was a member of the group of reporters whose work in exposing the Roman Catholic church's cover-up of clergy sex abuse earned The Boston Globe the 2003 Pulitzer Prize for Public Service. For his reporting and writing on the Church, he also shared the George Polk Award for National Reporting, the Goldsmith Prize for Investigative Reporting, the Selden Ring Award for Investigative Reporting, and numerous other honors.

Rezendes's reporting revealed that top Catholic officials had veiled the abuses committed by the Rev. John Geoghan, a Boston priest who molested more than 100 children in six parishes over three decades. In addition, Rezendes broke the stories about similar cover-ups by Church officials in New York City and Tucson, Arizona.

Further investigations as Spotlight member

Rezendes and the Spotlight Team were also Pulitzer Prize finalists for a series of stories that uncovered abuses in the debt collection industry. "Debtors Hell" won the Public Service Award from the Society of Professional Journalists and was a finalist for the Goldsmith Prize.

As a Spotlight Team member, Rezendes played a key role in many of the Globe's most significant investigations, including those probing the September 11 attacks on the World Trade Center and the Pentagon, financial corruption in the nation's charitable foundations, and the plight of mentally ill state prisoners. He was also on a team of reporters that won a first-place award from the Education Writers Association for a special section on school desegregation.

LDS Church scandal

On August 4th, 2022, Rezendes published "Seven years of sex abuse: How Mormon officials let it happen" which described how the Church of Jesus Christ of Latter-day Saints (LDS Church) had handled certain sexual abuse allegations received through their help line. The article revealed a number of instances where LDS Church knew about sexual abuse and did not report it to civil authorities because such communication was claimed by the Church to have been given under clergy privilege under state law. There have been criticisms of Rezendes' article from the LDS Church and church members, including allegations of misrepresentation of evidence found in court cases relied upon in the article. However, the church's official statement did not dispute any facts in Rezendes' story.

Books

He is a co-author of Betrayal: The Crisis in the Catholic Church, and a contributing author to Sin Against the Innocents: Sexual Abuse by Priests and the Role of the Catholic Church.

In popular culture

In the 2015 film Spotlight, he was portrayed by Mark Ruffalo, who was nominated for an Academy Award for Best Supporting Actor for his performance.

References

American investigative journalists
The Boston Globe people
Living people
Year of birth missing (living people)
Place of birth missing (living people)
Boston University College of Arts and Sciences alumni
American people of Portuguese descent
The Mercury News people